American School may refer to:

Schools
 American School (economics)
 American School (Panama)
 American School (Yemen)
 American School of Correspondence
 American School of Bombay
 American School in Japan
 American Schools and Hospitals Abroad
 Corporación Educativa American School
 ASF Mexico (American School in Mexico City)
 Escuela Americana El Salvador (American School El Salvador)
 American School of Tegucigalpa
 American School for the Deaf

Other
The American School (novel), a 1954 book by Nobuo Kojima

See also

 
 
 American International School (disambiguation)
 American Cooperative School (disambiguation)
 Education in the United States
 List of international schools